St Clare's, Middlesbrough is a Roman Catholic church in the Brookfield area of Middlesbrough, England. It was built in 1965 and is located close to the junction of the A19 and the A174.

History

Construction
The Church of St Clare Of Assisi was built from 1964 to 1965. It was originally part of the parish of St Francis of Assisi. It cost £35,000 and was designed by Thomas A. Crawford. On 11 February 1965 it was opened by the coadjutor Bishop of Middlesbrough Gordon Wheeler.

Developments
The church is of a fairly large size and of a typical design for churches built in the 1960s. The church was re-ordered after the Second Vatican Council, resulting in the tabernacle being moved to a separate Blessed Sacrament chapel in the church.

Parish
In 1967, the parish of St Francis of Assisi, centred in Acklam, Middlesbrough, was divided and St Clare's became a separate parish. This was caused by the greatly increased quantity of housing built in the locality and the consequent increased population. In 2013, it reverted from being a parish church to being again within the parish of St Francis of Assisi. It has one Sunday Mass at 9 am.

See also
 Diocese of Middlesbrough

References

External links

Churches in Middlesbrough
Roman Catholic churches in North Yorkshire
Roman Catholic Diocese of Middlesbrough